Treverbyn is a civil parish and village in mid-Cornwall, England, United Kingdom.

The church of St Peter is modern as the medieval chapel was closed at the time of the Reformation. The parish was formed from part of St Austell parish in 1847. Treverbyn parish includes the villages of Treverbyn, Carclaze, Stenalees, Penwithick, Bugle (the largest of these), Rescorla, Kerrow Moor, Carthew, Ruddlemoor, Bowling Green, Resugga Green, Scredda and parts of Trethurgy. The parish population at the 2011 census including Carluddon, Greensplatt, Knightor, Lavrean and Lower Menadue was 8,016.

Hensbarrow Beacon near Stenalees is the highest point of the St Austell Downs. There is a railway station at Bugle.

History

The Manor of Treverbyn was recorded in the Domesday Book (1086) when it was one of 28 manors held by Richard from Robert, Count of Mortain. There was one virgate of land and land for 3 ploughs. There were one and a half ploughs, 2 serfs, 2 villeins, 4 smallholders, 2 acres of woodland and 20 acres of pasture. The value of the manor was only 5 shillings, although it had formerly been worth 10 shillings. The manor of Tewington was one of the seventeen Antiqua maneria of the Duchy of Cornwall.

Mining

The area was once the site of tin and copper mines but during the 19th century extensive china clay works were established including one of the largest at Carclaze.

The Wheal Martyn Museum is at Ruddlemoor and part of the area forms the Wheal Martyn SSSI (Site of Special Scientific Interest), noted for its examples of granite. Also within the parish is Carn Grey Rock and Quarry SSSI, again noted for its geology.

Eco-town
In 2009, the clay company Imerys announced Baal Pit and West Carclaze would be the locations for up to 2,000 new eco-homes. The project was estimated to cost £9 million. The Baal pit was used in the 1971 Doctor Who episode Colony in Space featuring Jon Pertwee. The quarry was used to depict the surface of planet Uxarieus.

References

External links

 GENUKI website; Treverbyn

Civil parishes in Cornwall
Manors in Cornwall
Sites of Special Scientific Interest in Cornwall
Villages in Cornwall